Hugh Edward Hoare (26 March 1854 – 15 July 1929) was a British brewer and Liberal politician.

He was the sixth son of Henry Hoare, banker, of Iden Park, Staplehurst, Kent and his wife Mary Lady Marsham, daughter of the 2nd Earl of Romney. He was educated at Eton College and matriculated at Balliol College, Oxford in 1872.

Hoare was partner in the brewery company of Hoare and Company, Lower East Smithfield, and was on the boards of the New England Breweries and the United States Brewery Company. His interest in public affairs led to his election to the London School Board.

At the 1892 general election he was elected as Liberal Member of Parliament for the Western or Chesterton Division of Cambridgeshire, taking the seat from the Conservatives. He failed to hold the seat at the subsequent election in 1895 or regain it in 1900. He was again unsuccessful when he stood at Chelsea in December 1910.

He retired from politics, and devoted himself to his brewing interests and also became a director of the National Provident Institution. He died suddenly at his residence, Bix Hall, Henley on Thames, Oxfordshire in July 1929, aged 75.

References

External links
 

1854 births
1929 deaths
People educated at Eton College
Alumni of Balliol College, Oxford
Liberal Party (UK) MPs for English constituencies
UK MPs 1892–1895
Members of the London School Board
English brewers
Hoare family
People from Staplehurst
People from Henley-on-Thames